Skarstein or Skardstein is a village in Andøy Municipality in Nordland county, Norway. The village is located along Norwegian County Road 82 on the northeastern part of the island of Andøya, along the Andfjorden.

Trivia 
The village itself is named after a large rock near the local harbor, named Skarvesteinen, meaning "The Cormorant rock" in Norwegian. Its name is derived from the Cormorants that usually inhabit the rock's surface.

References

Andøy
Villages in Nordland
Populated places of Arctic Norway